Bjarni Ólafur Eiríksson (born 28 March 1982) is a retired Icelandic football defender.

Career
He signed for Stabæk Fotball, 2008 winner of the Norwegian Tippeligaen in February 2010 after one week on trial. Stabæk manager Jan Jönsson was highly impressed by the strong left footed defender. After the 2012 season, he rejected having his contract renewed. He rejoined local team Valur before the 2013 season.

He made 21 caps for the Iceland national football team.

Career statistics

References

External links
 
 

1982 births
Living people
Bjarni Olafur Eiriksson
Bjarni Olafur Eiriksson
Iceland under-21 international footballers
Bjarni Olafur Eiriksson
Bjarni Olafur Eiriksson
Silkeborg IF players
Stabæk Fotball players
Bjarni Olafur Eiriksson
Bjarni Olafur Eiriksson
Danish Superliga players
Eliteserien players
Expatriate men's footballers in Denmark
Expatriate footballers in Norway
Bjarni Olafur Eiriksson
Bjarni Olafur Eiriksson
Association football defenders